Ryszard Budka (born 17 July 1935) is a Polish footballer. He played in two matches for the Poland national football team in 1962.

References

External links
 
 

1935 births
Living people
Polish footballers
Poland international footballers
Place of birth missing (living people)
Association football defenders
Wisła Kraków players